Zhang Yiming (born April 1, 1983) is a Chinese internet entrepreneur. He founded ByteDance in 2012 and developed the news aggregator Toutiao and the video sharing platform TikTok (Douyin/抖音), formerly known as Musical.ly. As of October 2022, Zhang's personal wealth was estimated at US$55 billion, according to Bloomberg Billionaires Index (US $49.5 billion, according to Forbes), making him the second-richest person in China, after Zhong Shanshan. On November 4, 2021, Zhang stepped down as CEO of ByteDance, completing a leadership handover announced in May 2021.

Early life and career 
Zhang was born on April 1, 1983, in Longyang Fujian, China. In 2001, he enrolled at Nankai University in Tianjin, where he majored in microelectronics before changing to software engineering, and graduated in 2005. He met his wife at university.

In February 2006, Zhang became the fifth employee and the first engineer at the travel website Kuxun, and he was promoted to technical director a year later.

In 2008, Zhang left Kuxun to work for Microsoft, but felt stifled by its corporate rules. He soon left Microsoft to join the startup Fanfou, which eventually failed. In 2009, when Expedia was about to acquire Kuxun, Zhang took over Kuxun's real estate search business and started 99fang.com, his first company.

ByteDance 

Zhang thought that Chinese smartphone users were struggling to find information in mobile apps available in 2012, and the search giant Baidu was mixing search results with undisclosed advertising. His vision was to push relevant content to users using recommendations generated by artificial intelligence. This vision was not shared by most venture capitalists, and he failed to secure funding until Susquehanna International Group agreed to invest in the startup. In August 2012, ByteDance launched the Toutiao news app and within two years attracted more than 13 million daily users. Sequoia Capital, which initally rejected Zhang, came around and led a US$100 million investment in the company in 2014.

Zhang focused on expanding ByteDance globally, as opposed to other Chinese tech CEOs who focused on the domestic growth of their companies. He insisted that ByteDance's workplace productivity app Lark be targeted at the American, European and Japanese markets, rather than limiting the focus to China as originally proposed. Zhang's management style with ByteDance was modeled on US tech companies such as Google and included bimonthly town hall meetings and discouraging employees from calling him "boss" or "CEO", as is the Chinese convention.

In September 2015, ByteDance launched its video-sharing app TikTok (known as Douyin in China) with little fanfare. The product was an instant hit with millennials and became popular worldwide. ByteDance bought Musical.ly a year later for US$800 million and integrated it into TikTok.

In 2018, the National Radio and Television Administration shut down ByteDance's first app, Neihan Duanzi. In response, Zhang issued an apology, writing that the app was "incommensurate with socialist core values" and had a "weak" implementation of Xi Jinping Thought, and promised that ByteDance would "further deepen cooperation" with the ruling Chinese Communist Party to better promote its policies.

As of late 2018, with more than a billion monthly users across its mobile apps, ByteDance is valued at US$75 billion, surpassing Uber as the world's most valuable startup.

In September 2020, the United States Department of Justice called Zhang a "mouthpiece" of the Chinese Communist Party in a legal filing.

In May 2021, Zhang said that he would step down as CEO and be succeeded by Liang Rubo.

Honours and recognition 
Forbes named Zhang in its 2013 China 30 Under 30 list. In 2018, he was included in Fortune magazine's 40 Under 40 list. Zhang was named one of Time magazine's 100 Most Influential People of 2019.

References 

1983 births
Living people
21st-century Chinese businesspeople
ByteDance people
Chinese billionaires
Chinese computer businesspeople
Chinese software engineers
Chinese technology company founders
Microsoft people
Nankai University alumni
Businesspeople from Fujian
People from Longyan
Billionaires from Fujian